The 6th Separate Tank Brigade (Military Unit Number 54096) was a formation of the Russian Ground Forces. The brigade fought in the war in Donbas of 2014–2015.

History 
The brigade was formed in June 2009 as part of the 20th Guards Army in Mulino from the 100th Tank Regiment. The 100th Tank Regiment was originally formed as the 100th Tank Brigade in 1942. For its actions during World War II, the brigade was awarded the Order of the Red Banner, the Order of Kutuzov 2nd class, and the honorific "Czestochowa". In 1945 the brigade, part of the 31st Tank Corps, became the 100th Tank Regiment as part of a reorganization of the Soviet Tank Troops. At the same time the corps became the 31st Tank Division. The regiment was based in Khmelnitsky. The regiment fought in Operation Danube, the suppression of the Prague Spring. After the end of the operation the regiment stayed in Czechoslovakia with the division and was based at Frenštát pod Radhoštěm. In early 1990 the regiment withdrew to Dzerzhinsk.

In August 2014 the brigade's units fought in the Battle of Ilovaisk. On 26 August, during a fight near Ahronomichne village, a T-72B3 tank of the 1st Company of the brigade's 3rd Battalion was captured by troops of the Ukrainian 51st Mechanized Brigade. During the Ukrainian forces' withdrawal from Ilovaisk on 29 August, Donbas Battalion fighters were able to seize and destroy another two brigade T-72B3 tanks near Chervonosilske village, capturing two prisoners: Ivan Badanin and Eugen Chernov, as well as some paratroopers of the 31st Air Assault Brigade.

In November 2014 the brigade became part of the 1st Guards Tank Army. In February 2015 the brigade's units fought in Battle of Debaltseve.

In 2022, the brigade was disbanded. Elements of it were reformed as the 26th Tank Regiment, the 1077th Separate Logistics Bataillon and the 63rd separate Anti-Aircraft Missile Unit as part of the re-established 47th Guards Tank Division. The 26th Tank Regiment took part in the 2022 Russian invasion of Ukraine on the Northeastern front.

Commanders 
 Colonel Vyacheslav Nikolaevich Gurov (30 March 2011 — 20 January 2012)
 ...
 Dmitri Nikolaevich Baklushin (???? — 2022)

References 

Tank brigades of Russia
Military units and formations of Russia in the war in Donbas
Military units and formations disestablished in 2022